A magic mug, also known as a heat changing mug, transforming mug, or disappearing mug is a mug that changes color when it is filled with a hot liquid. This effect is created by using thermochromic ink.

Magic mugs are often manufactured and sold as memorabilia. For example, a mug may reveal a picture of the town or monument where it was sold, for example the Haunted Mansion/Grim Grinning Ghost Disney cup. They are sometimes given away to promote organizations. Customers can also have their own photographs printed on the mugs.

In 2017, Panasonic introduced the concept of "smart magic mugs" when it showcased an in-car display table/screen that automatically rearranges the digitally displayed information around a mug when the latter is placed on it.

See also
 Noggin (cup)
 Fuddling cup
 Plastic cup
 Coffee cup

References

Drinkware
Memorabilia